= Ahmad Shimi =

Veterinarian

- Born: 1915; Borujerd
- Died: 10 July 2014 (aged 98–99); Tehran
- Citizenship: Iran
- Education: Faculty of Veterinary Medicine, University of Tehran

Ahmed Shimi (1915 - July 10, 2014) was a microbiologist, veterinarian and university professor from Iran. He is one of the winners of the 5th edition of the lasting figures in the field of microbiology (2014).

== Life ==
Shimi was born in Borujerd in 1294 solar year. After obtaining his diploma from Shahid Rajai High School in Tehran, he entered the Faculty of Veterinary Medicine at the University of Tehran and received his doctorate in 1321. He then taught at the University of Tehran and retired in 1358. During these years, Ahmad Shimi established the Bacteriology Laboratory, Virology Laboratory, and Avian Diseases Department at the University of Tehran. From 1361 to 1382, he also taught at the Islamic Azad University.

He died on Thursday, 19 Tir 1393, due to old age
